Virgil Eugene Hill (born January 18, 1964) is an American former professional boxer who competed from 1984 to 2007, and in 2015. He is a two-weight world champion, having held the WBA light heavyweight title twice, from 1987 to 1997; the IBF and lineal light heavyweight titles from 1996 to 1997; and the WBA cruiserweight title twice, from 2000 to 2002 and 2006 to 2007. As an amateur, Hill won a silver medal in the middleweight division at the 1984 Summer Olympics. In 2013, he was inducted into the International Boxing Hall of Fame.

Amateur career
At the 1984 Summer Olympics Hill represented the United States as a Middleweight then age 20, and won a silver medal in a close decision loss in the 165-lb final. His results were:
 Defeated  Edward Neblett RSC 2
 Defeated  Brian Schumacher 5-0
 Defeated  Damir Škaro 4-1
 Defeated  Mohamed Zaoui 5-0
 Lost to   Shin Joon-Sup 2-3

Hill was the 1984 National Golden Gloves champion at Middleweight. Hill ended his amateur career with a record of 288-11.

Professional career

Light-heavyweight

In September 1987, after going eighteen straight fights without a loss to start his pro career, Hill aka 'Quicksilver' (his nickname) was a challenger to Leslie Stewart of Trinidad for the latter's World Boxing Association light-heavyweight title in Atlantic City.  After an even match in the early going, Hill floored the defending title holder twice in the fourth round – first with a left hook and the second time with an uppercut – to take the title on a Knockout win.

A series of ten successful defenses followed, eight of which took place in Bismarck, North Dakota. Hill received offers to fight in Las Vegas and other cities, but chose the place of his 'roots' and 'hometown fans' to be the place of the majority of his defenses. Opponents in his first run as champion included Bobby Czyz and James Kinchen. Superstar Thomas Hearns would meet – and defeat – Hill in Las Vegas by decision in June 1991 to end Hill's first reign as champion.

In September 1992, it was Hill pitted against 1984 Olympic teammate Frank Tate for the vacant WBA 175-lb. title.  It was a 'grudge match' between the two, and Hill won the title on his home turf of Bismarck. Another string of ten defenses would follow, including a rematch with Tate, a close decision over Lou Del Valle who almost upset Hill.

Unification matches
In November 1996 at the Olympiahalle, Munich, Hill won over the undefeated IBF champion Henry Maske to unify the WBA/IBF belts and win the vacant Lineal championship. In June 1997, WBO champion Dariusz Michalczewski scored a unanimous decision over Hill to unify the WBA, IBF, WBO and Lineal light-heavyweight titles at Arena Oberhausen, Oberhausen, Germany.

Hill boxed against Roy Jones Jr. the following year, and was stopped in round four with a body shot.

Cruiserweight
The aging Hill won the WBA cruiserweight title at age 36 by knocking down Fabrice Tiozzo three times in Villeurbanne, France, by TKO in the first. He made his first defense, also in France, against Jean-Marc Mormeck, but would lose both match and title on cuts after nine rounds.  In July 2003 he decisioned Donny Lalonde in a North Dakota-Manitoba 'border fight'. He lost a disputed decision to Mormeck in a title rematch in South Africa in May 2004.

On January 27, 2006 Virgil Hill won over previously undefeated Russian cruiserweight Valery Brudov by unanimous decision to win the 'regular' WBA cruiserweight title, as the WBA had now created a WBA "Super" title beside the standard WBA title. Despite being cut on the face in the sixth round, Hill was able to out hustle and out work his much younger opponent to capture his fifth world title at the age of 42.

He had his next to last fight in Germany on March 31, 2007, facing Henry Maske, whom he had beaten in 1996. Maske had announced his retirement prior to that fight and was frustrated to end his career with a split-decision loss, the only loss in his professional career. When he heard about Hill capturing the world title again at the age of 42, he decided to challenge him for a rematch. Hill lost the Maske rematch by decision in a non-title bout, then lost to Firat Arslan by decision to lose his WBA cruiserweight title.

He retired with a record of 50 wins (23 KOs) and 7 losses.

On July 16, 2011 Hill worked with his wife, Carla Hill, for their first ever boxing card and promotion at Resorts Casino Hotel in Atlantic City, New Jersey,

Hall of Fame
On November 12, 2012 he was officially inducted into the International Boxing Hall of Fame, Class of 2013.

Professional boxing record

See also
List of light heavyweight boxing champions
List of WBA world champions
List of IBF world champions

References

External links

Virgil Hill's amateur boxing becord
Virgil Hill - CBZ Profile

1964 births
Living people
People from Clinton, Missouri
Boxers from Missouri
Boxers at the 1984 Summer Olympics
Cruiserweight boxers
International Boxing Federation champions
Light-heavyweight boxers
Olympic boxers of the United States
Olympic silver medalists for the United States in boxing
Boxers from North Dakota
Sportspeople from Bismarck, North Dakota
Sportspeople from Grand Forks, North Dakota
Sportspeople from Joplin, Missouri
20th-century Native Americans
21st-century Native Americans
American people of Native American descent
American people of Puerto Rican descent
Native American boxers
World Boxing Association champions
American male boxers
Medalists at the 1984 Summer Olympics
Middleweight boxers
World light-heavyweight boxing champions
World cruiserweight boxing champions
National Golden Gloves champions
International Boxing Hall of Fame inductees